Seegers is a patronymic surname. Notable persons with that name include:

 Doug Seegers, American guitarist and songwriter
 Rainer Seegers (born 1952), German percussionist and timpanist
 Wendy Seegers (born 1976), South African athlete
 William Seegers (1900–2007), American soldier

See also
 Segers
 Zeegers

References

Patronymic surnames